The women's Jianshu / Qiangshu all-round competition at the 2014 Asian Games in Incheon, South Korea was held on 21 September at the Ganghwa Dolmens Gymnasium.

Schedule
All times are Korea Standard Time (UTC+09:00)

Results

References

Jianshu Results
Qiangshu Results

Women's jianshu